Medea is a 1959 American TV play. It is based on the adaptation of the play by Euripides. Judith Anderson plays the title role, which she had great success performing on stage ever since 1948.

It was the first in a series called Play of the Week on the TV station WTNA.  David Susskind produced. The production budget for each show was around $35,000.

Cast
Judith Anderson as Medea
Aline McMahon
Colleen Dewhurst

Reception
The New York Times praised Anderson as giving "a performance of stunning and enveloping power."

The Los Angeles Times called it a "tour de force" although said it was "theatre not television."

References

External links
Medea at IMDb

1959 films
1959 television films
Films based on Medea (Euripides play)
American television films